Lethbridge (formerly known as  Lethbridge—Foothills) is a federal electoral district in Alberta, Canada, that has been represented in the House of Commons of Canada since 1917. It incorporates the City of Lethbridge and Lethbridge County. 

Lethbridge has had a centre-right MP at the federal level since the 1930s. The current MP for Lethbridge is Rachael Thomas, who was first elected to parliament in 2015 for the Conservatives and was re-elected in 2021 as a Conservative MP.

History

This riding was originally created in 1914 from parts of Macleod riding.

In 1977, it was renamed "Lethbridge—Foothills".

In 1987, Lethbridge—Foothills was abolished and replaced by a new "Lethbridge" riding. The new riding was created from most of Lethbridge—Foothills, along with parts of Macleod and Medicine Hat ridings.

It has been represented by centre-right MPs without interruption since 1930.  As in most other federal Alberta ridings outside of Calgary and Edmonton, it usually supports the major right-wing party of the day by landslide margins. Since 1945, a non-conservative party has only won 30 percent of the vote three times. Lethbridge itself is somewhat friendlier to centre-left candidates, at least at the provincial level, which helps reduce the overall margins compared to surrounding ridings. The Alberta New Democratic Party (NDP) won both seats in the provincial legislature from the city in the 2015 provincial election, but in 2019 lost the Lethbridge East riding to the United Conservative Party (UCP). The city has occasionally elected provincial Liberals in the past as well.  At the federal level, however, the NDP and the Liberals are no match for the overwhelming conservative bent of the more rural areas.

This riding lost territory to Medicine Hat—Cardston—Warner and Foothills during the 2012 electoral redistribution.

Members of Parliament

Current Member of Parliament
Its Member of Parliament is Rachael Thomas. She was first elected in 2015. She is a member of the Conservative Party of Canada.

Election results

Lethbridge, 1987–present

Lethbridge—Foothills, 1977–1987

Lethbridge, 1914–1977

Note: Progressive Conservative vote is compared to "National Government" vote in 1940 election. Social Credit vote is compared to New Democracy vote in 1940 election.

Note: "National Government" vote is compared to Conservative vote in 1935 election. New Democracy vote is compared to Social Credit vote in 1935 election.

Note: CCF vote is compared to Progressive vote in 1930 election.

Note: Progressive vote is compared to UFA vote in 1926 election.

Note: UFA vote is compared to Progressive vote in 1925 election.

|-

|Opposition-Labour
|Lambert "L" Pack||align=right|2,468||align=right|31.76

See also
 List of Canadian federal electoral districts
 Past Canadian electoral districts

References

Notes

External links
 
 
 
 Expenditures - 2008
 Expenditures - 2004
 Expenditures - 2000
 Expenditures - 1997
 Elections Canada
 Website of the Parliament of Canada

Alberta federal electoral districts
Politics of Lethbridge